The politics of Cameroon takes place in a framework of a unitary presidential republic, whereby the President of Cameroon is both head of state and head of government, and of a multi-party system. A prime ministerial position exists and is nominally head of government, implying a semi-presidential system, although de facto only serves to assist the president. Executive power is exercised by the government. Legislative power is vested in both the government and the National Assembly of Cameroon.

Political background
The government adopted legislation in 1997 to authorize the formation of multiple political parties and ease restrictions on forming civil associations and private newspapers. Cameroon's first multiparty legislative and presidential elections were held in 1992 followed by municipal elections in 1996 and another round of legislative and presidential elections in 1997. Because the government refused to consider opposition demands for an independent election commission, the three major opposition parties boycotted the October 1997 presidential election, which Biya easily won. The leader of one of the opposition parties, Bello Bouba Maigari of the NUDP, subsequently joined the government.

Cameroon has a number of independent newspapers. Censorship was abolished in 1996, but the government sometimes seizes or suspends newspapers and occasionally arrests journalists. Although a 1990 law authorizes private radio and television stations, the government has not granted any licenses as of March 1998.

The Cameroonian Government's human rights record has been improving over the years but remains flawed. There continue to be reported abuses, including beatings of detainees, arbitrary arrests, and illegal searches. The judiciary is frequently corrupt, inefficient, and subject to political influence.

Worthy of note is the fact that Cameroon is the only country in which two Constitutions are applicable side by side. For example, the 1972 Constitution designates the Prime Minister as constitutional successor of the Head of State in case of incapacity, death, resignation or unaccountable absence of the incumbent. Contrarily, the 1996 Constitutional Reform designates the President of the Senate as constitutional successor; but the Senate (provided for by 1996 Reform) does not exist. Apart from increasing the presidential mandate from 5 years to 7 years, very few amendments of the 1996 Constitutional Reform have been applied.

Executive branch

|President
|Paul Biya
|Cameroon People's Democratic Movement
|6 November 1982
|-
|Prime Minister
|Joseph Dion Ngute
|Cameroon People's Democratic Movement
|4 January 2019
|}

The 1972 constitution of the Republic of Cameroon as modified by 1996 reforms provides for a strong central government dominated by the executive. The president is empowered to name and dismiss cabinet members (regardless of parliamentary representation), judges, generals, provincial governors, prefects, sub-prefects, and heads of Cameroon's parastatal (about 100 state-controlled) firms, obligate or disburse expenditures, approve or veto regulations, declare states of emergency, and appropriate and spend profits of parastatal firms. The president is not required to consult the National Assembly.  In 2008, a constitutional amendment was passed that eliminated term limits for president.

The judiciary is subordinate to the executive branch's Ministry of Justice. The Supreme court may review the constitutionality of a law only at the president's request.

All local government officials are employees of the central government's Ministry of Territorial Administration, from which local governments also get most of their budgets.

While the president, the minister of justice, and the president's judicial advisers (the Supreme Court) top the judicial hierarchy, traditional rulers, courts, and councils also exercise functions of government. Traditional courts still play a major role in domestic, property, and probate law. Tribal laws and customs are honored in the formal court system when not in conflict with national law. Traditional rulers receive stipends from the national government.

Legislative branch
The 180-member National Assembly meets in ordinary session three times a year (March/April, June/July, and November/December), and has seldom, until recently, made major changes in legislation proposed by the executive. Laws are adopted by majority vote of members present or, if the president demands a second reading, of a total membership.

Following government pledges to reform the strongly centralized 1972 constitution, the National Assembly adopted a number of amendments in December 1995 which were promulgated in January 1996. The amendments call for the establishment of a 100-member senate as part of a bicameral legislature, the creation of regional councils, and the fixing of the presidential term to 7 years, renewable once. One-third of senators are to be appointed by the President, and the remaining two-thirds are to be chosen by indirect elections. The government has established the Senate in 2013.

Political parties and elections

Judicial branch
The judiciary is subordinate to the executive branch's Ministry of Justice. The Supreme Court may review the constitutionality of a law only at the president's request.

The role of women 
In an article on the construction of a ‘model Cameroonian woman’ in the Cameroonian parliament, Lilian Atanga, examines arguments used to perpetuate a popular ideal and discourses which "sustain and maintain the status quo (e.g. of women as domestic or women as cooks)".

International organization participation
Cameroon is member of:
ACCT, ACP, AfDB, BDEAC, C, CEEAC, ECA, FAO, FZ, G-77, IAEA, IBRD, ICAO, ICC, ICRM, IDA, IDB, IFAD, IFC, IFRCS, ILO, IMF, IMO, Inmarsat, Intelsat, Interpol, IOC, ITU, ITUC, NAM, OAU, OIC, OPCW, PCA, UDEAC, UN, UNCTAD, UNESCO, UNIDO, UNITAR, UPU, WCO, WFTU, WHO, WIPO, WMO, WToO, WTrO

See also

Cameroon public administration structure
List of governments of Cameroon

References